Penwhaupell is a locality in the North Burnett Region, Queensland, Australia.

History 
Penwhaupell is the name of a cattle station in the North Burnett Queensland Australia.  Its name is derived from Penwapple Reservoir near Girvan in Scotland and was named by its first owner Thomas Gray, who originated from Girvan. 'Pen' means Home of and 'Whaupell or 'wapple' means many hills.  It was then sold to Ben Micklewaith and the newspaper clipping of a ball at Penwhaupell is found below. It was then sold to Lindemans who attempted to grow grapes, however it was then sold to the Bambling Bros in mid 1920s. 

.

References 

North Burnett Region
Localities in Queensland